Mountain Pass is an unincorporated community in San Bernardino County, California, United States. It has a population of 30.

The most prominent feature of the town, and its reason for existence, is the Mountain Pass Mine, an open pit mine for rare-earth elements. The mine and its associated processing facilities are owned by MP Materials, which purchased the assets out of bankruptcy on July 10, 2017.

Climate

Typical of the High Desert, Mountain Pass has a cold semi-arid climate (Köppen climate classification BSk), Winters are chilly but also sunny, with daytime highs around 50 and nighttime lows just below freezing. Summers are hot and somewhat wetter, with July, the hottest month, having a normal high in the low 90s. Although dry weather usually prevails in most months, the wettest months are July and August when thunderstorms commonly form over the nearby mountain ranges, which can cause flash flooding. Snow is rare but not uncommon, usually falling 2-3 times a year. Most of the snow doesn't stick to the ground very long, usually melting by mid afternoon.

References

Geology of California
Unincorporated communities in California
Unincorporated communities in San Bernardino County, California